Should Girls Kiss Soldiers? is a 1918 Australian short silent film directed by P. J. Ramster, based on a play he had written.

It was the first of several movies Ramster made titled with rhetorical questions.

It is considered a lost film.

References

1918 films
Lost Australian films
Australian drama films
Australian silent short films
Australian black-and-white films
1918 drama films
1918 lost films
Lost drama films
Silent drama films